Nizam Mir Muhammad Azmet Ali Khan, Asaf Jah IX, known as Azmet Jah (also spelt as Azmat Jah, born 23 July 1960), is the current head of the House of Asaf Jah and pretender to the title of Nizam of Hyderabad and Berar since 20 January 2023.

Early life, family and education 

Azmet Jah was born on 23 July 1960 in Paddington, London, to Mukarram Jah and Esra Jah, during the reign of his great-grandfather, Mir Osman Ali Khan, the seventh Nizam of Hyderabad. He did his early schooling in London. He attended the University of Southern California, from where he graduated in 1984. He married in London in 1996 to Zeynap Naz Güvendiren, daughter of Altan Güvendiren, and has a son named Murad Jah.

Career
He is a professional photographer and cinematographer and has worked with Steven Spielberg and Lord Richard Attenborough. 

He has wielded the camera for Hollywood films, such as Basic Instinct, Indiana Jones and the Last Crusade, Navy Seals and Life of Charlie Chaplin.

In 2011, he stated that he was working on two films, one on Mustafa Kemal Atatürk (the first President of Turkey) and another one on his great grandfather, Osman Ali Khan, Asaf Jah VII, the Seventh Nizam of Hyderabad Deccan.

Accession

Azmet Jah acceded to the throne of the former Hyderabad State on 14 January 2023, following the death of his father, Mukarram Jah.

Azmet Jah's ceremonial coronation took place on 20 January 2023. The coronation ceremony of Azmet Jah followed a pattern similar to the coronations of the Nizams before him, but it was a simple ceremony only attended by a few close friends nether was it recognized by the state government. It was held at Khilwat Mubarak at Chowmahalla Palace in Hyderabad.

Controversy
Members of the HEH Sahebzadas of Sarf-e-Khas Trust’ (supposedly representing 4500 direct descendants of the first six Nizams of Hyderabad) had questioned Azmet Jah's legitimacy as the ninth Nizam of Hyderabad and they have nominated Raunaq Yar Khan to be the 9th Nizam of Hyderabad. In a press meeting held by members of the HEH Sahebzadas of Sarf-e-Khas Trust on Saturday in Hyderabad, the vice president Mir Nizamuddin Ali Khan said that the decision was taken as Azmet Jah was ‘incommunicado’ with his extended family members after he was appointed as the titular ninth Nizam.

See also
 Najaf Ali Khan - Uncle of Azmet Jah
 Nizam of Hyderabad
 Asaf Jahi dynasty
 Hyderabad State

References

External

1960 births
Living people
Asaf Jahi dynasty
Nizams of Hyderabad
People from Paddington
University of Southern California alumni